John Edgar Roberts (15 March 1910 – 1 June 1985) was an English footballer and international baseball player. He had the nickname of "Nipper" Roberts.

A forward, he played amateur football for Marine, Orrell, Blundellsands, and the Northern Nomads. He represented England amateurs, before entering the Football League with Southport. He joined Liverpool in May 1933, but left the club the following June after playing just one league game. He spent 18 months with Cheshire League champions Wigan Athletic, scoring 54 goals in 59 league appearances. He returned to the Football League with Port Vale in December 1935. He twice finished as the club's top-scorer, and no Football League player scored more league goals than Roberts in the 1937–38 season. He retired as a professional player to serve in the Irish Guards in World War II. He was captured by enemy forces, but escaped from captivity to walk 400 miles back to Allied territory in 1944.

Football career

Early career
Roberts played for non-league amateur sides Marine, Orrell, Blundellsands, and Northern Nomads, before signing with professional club Southport. During his amateur days he also represented the England national amateur team. He made his Third Division North debut for Southport on 21 November 1931, in a 1–1 draw with Chester. He scored his first goal in the Football League on 28 January 1933, in a 4–1 win over Crewe Alexandra at Haig Avenue. He played in the 1933 Liverpool Senior Cup final defeat to New Brighton, scoring Southport's goal in the 6–1 loss.

Liverpool
Roberts signed with First Division giants Liverpool in May 1933, and made his debut on 4 September 1933, in a 1–1 draw with Stoke City at the Victoria Ground. This was his only appearance of the "Reds" highly disappointing 1933–34 campaign – which saw Liverpool narrowly avoiding the relegation zone – and he departed Anfield for Cheshire League side Wigan Athletic in June 1934.

Wigan Athletic
Forming a deadly partnership with Georgie Scott, Roberts proved to be a revelation for Charlie Spencer's "Latics". He scored 46 goals in 42 league games in 1934–35, as Wigan won the Cheshire League title. He also hit six goals in the FA Cup, as the non-league side reached the Third Round of the competition, where they bowed out with a defeat at Millwall. He added eight goals in 15 league games the following season, but had already ensured himself a return to the Football League.

Port Vale
He joined Second Division side Port Vale for a large fee in December 1935. He hit 12 goals in 21 appearances in 1935–36, becoming the club's top-scorer despite playing only half of the season. His arrival proved to have come too late however, and the "Valiants" failed to escape the relegation zone, finishing one point behind Barnsley in 20th place. Roberts nevertheless proved himself to be a forward of some promise, scoring a hat-trick past Hull City in a 4–0 win at The Old Recreation Ground on 2 March, and also finding the net twice at Vetch Field and once at St James' Park.

Roberts was dropped from the first team in November of the 1936–37 season, but still managed to score eight goals in 16 appearances. Vale finished the season in 11th place in the Third Division North under the stewardship of former England international Warney Cresswell. Cresswell instead favoured a forward partnership of Tom Nolan and Tommy Ward, and also tried Syd Goodfellow in the number ten role.

Cresswell soon left the club for another management post, allowing Roberts to return the first eleven at the start of the 1937–38 campaign. He was once again prolific, scoring 28 league and two FA Cup goals in 40 competitive appearances. This record made him not only Port Vale's top-scorer, but also the Football League's joint-highest scorer, along with Everton's Tommy Lawton. During the campaign, Roberts hit all four goals in a home win over Barrow on 25 September, and also hit a hat-trick past Accrington Stanley in a 4–1 home win on 8 January. Despite his exploits in front of goal, Port Vale could only manage a 15th-place finish, and won just one of their 21 away games.

Port Vale were placed in the Third Division South in the 1938–39 season. Roberts scored only ten goals in 21 games, having been forced to miss much of the season after dislocating his shoulder in a 4–0 win over Bristol City on New Year's Eve. The club could only manage an 18th-place finish, they lost six of their next eight games following Roberts's injury, finding the net just four times. Nolan finished as the club's top-scorer with 17 goals, though outside of Nolan and Roberts there were no players with more than five league goals.

He guested for Wrexham in the autumn of 1939. He left Port Vale for good the following year to fight for the Allies in World War II. He scored a total of 74 goals in 118 competitive games in five years at the club.

Baseball career
Roberts was also a baseball player and captained the England team.

World War II
During the war, Roberts enlisted in the Irish Guards and was captured in Tunisia on 25 March 1943. He managed to escape from an Italian prisoner-of-war camp in November 1943, walking 400 miles to freedom with a broken neck.

Career statistics
Source:

References

1910 births
1985 deaths
Footballers from Liverpool
English footballers
England amateur international footballers
Association football forwards
Northern Nomads F.C. players
Marine F.C. players
Southport F.C. players
Liverpool F.C. players
Wigan Athletic F.C. players
Port Vale F.C. players
Wrexham F.C. wartime guest players
English Football League players
Players of British baseball
British Army personnel of World War II
Irish Guards soldiers
British World War II prisoners of war
World War II prisoners of war held by Germany